54 Nude Honeys is the eponymous fourth full-length album from Japanese punk rock band 54 Nude Honeys, released on July 9, 2003. It is also the group's final full-length studio album.

Track listing

References

2003 albums
54 Nude Honeys albums